The 1996 Speedway Grand Prix of Poland was the first race of the 1996 Speedway Grand Prix season. It took place on 18 May in the Olympic Stadium in Wrocław, Poland and was won by Danish rider Tommy Knudsen. Knudsen was the first rider who won in three SGP Events.

Starting positions draw 

The Speedway Grand Prix Commission nominated Tomasz Gollob as Wild Card. Gollob was Polish SGP Winner last season.

Heat details

The intermediate classification

See also 
 Speedway Grand Prix
 List of Speedway Grand Prix riders

References

External links 
 FIM-live.com
 SpeedwayWorld.tv

Speedway Grand Prix of Poland
P
1996
Sport in Wrocław